Party of Regions was a Ukrainian political party.

Party of Regions may also refer to:
Party of Regions (Polish), Polish political party
Party of Regions of Moldova (Partidul Regiunilor din Moldova)

See also
United Regions of Serbia, Serbian political party